"Sweat It Out" is the fourth single from The-Dream's second studio album, Love vs. Money.

Music video
On September 26, 2009, in an interview with Rap-Up, Tricky Stewart confirmed that music videos for both "Sweat It Out" and "Fancy" are going to be filmed soon. Eventually, however, those plans were scrapped as The-Dream confirmed via Twitter that he is no longer promoting singles from Love vs. Money.

Charts

References

2009 singles
The-Dream songs
Songs written by The-Dream
Songs written by Tricky Stewart
Song recordings produced by Tricky Stewart
2009 songs
Def Jam Recordings singles
Song recordings produced by The-Dream